Vladislav Mirchev (born 23 January 1987) is a Bulgarian footballer who plays for Septemvri Tervel as a forward.

Career
Born in Varna, Mirchev was a product of the Spartak Varna system. In June 2004, he was moved from the youth squad to the first team. Mirchev made his debut during the 2004–05 season in A PFG, on 13 August 2004 against PFC Rodopa Smolyan. The club was relegated to B PFG at the end of the season. He scored his first goal for Spartak in their 2–0 victory over Maritsa Plovdiv on 10 September 2005. Mirchev helped the club to promotion to A PFG in 2006.
 
In May 2006 Mirchev eventually signed a one-year loan deal with Chernomorets Burgas, making his debut in an away draw against Dunav Ruse on 30 September 2006.

One-a-half-year later Mirchev was loaned to the Belarusian side BATE Borisov for four months. With BATE he played in the UEFA Champions League 2008-09 group stage. On 9 September 2008 Mirchev scored a hat-trick for BATE in a match of the Belarusian Cup against Neman Most. He scored goals in the 38th, 40th and 74th minute. The result of the match was a 7–3 win for BATE. On 14 September Mirchev scored his first league goal for the club against Naftan Novopolotsk. A few days later Mirchev made his Champions League debut against Real Madrid at the Santiago Bernabéu Stadium. Before he returned to Spartak he became a champion of Belarus in November 2008.

He signed for Italian team A.C. Ancona in August 2009, for two-year contract.

After impressing with FC Bdin, Mirchev signed a contract with Irtysh Pavlodar in the summer of 2012.

Mirchev's nomadic career has taken him to 9 clubs in 6 years. He has played in Bulgaria, Kazakhstan, Cyprus, Maldives and finally; Malaysia

In December 2016, Mirchev joined Malaysian club Perak The Bos Gaurus, signing a two-year contract.

International career
In 2007 Mirchev played in Bulgaria national under-21 football team.

Honours

Club
Spartak Varna
B Group: 2005–06

Chernomorets Burgas
B Group: 2006–07

BATE Borisov
Belarusian Premier League: 2008

Irtysh Pavlodar
Kazakhstan Premier League runner-up: 2012
Kazakhstan Cup runner-up: 2012

Spartak Varna
A Regional Group: 2015–16

Individual
B Group top goalscorer: 2011–12
A Regional Group top goalscorer: 2015–16

References

External links
 

1987 births
Living people
Bulgarian footballers
Bulgaria youth international footballers
Bulgaria under-21 international footballers
Bulgarian expatriate footballers
Bulgarian expatriate sportspeople in Malaysia
Expatriate footballers in Belarus
Expatriate footballers in Italy
Expatriate footballers in Belgium
Expatriate footballers in Kazakhstan
Expatriate footballers in Cyprus
Expatriate footballers in the Maldives
Expatriate footballers in Malaysia
First Professional Football League (Bulgaria) players
Serie B players
Challenger Pro League players
Kazakhstan Premier League players
Cypriot Second Division players
Malaysia Super League players
PFC Spartak Varna players
PFC Chernomorets Burgas players
FC BATE Borisov players
A.C. Ancona players
K.V. Oostende players
OFC Bdin Vidin players
FC Irtysh Pavlodar players
PFC Lokomotiv Plovdiv players
Club Valencia players
PFC Nesebar players
Perak F.C. players
FC Chernomorets Balchik players
FC Lokomotiv Gorna Oryahovitsa players
Bulgarian expatriate sportspeople in the Maldives
Association football forwards